The Palau Island dtella (Gehyra brevipalmata) is a species of gecko. It is endemic to the Palau Islands.

References

Gehyra
Endemic fauna of Palau
Reptiles of Palau
Reptiles described in 1874
Taxa named by Wilhelm Peters